Shooting sports at the 1958 Asian Games were held in Nagasaka & Tomioka Rifle Ranges and Murayama Shooting Range Tokyo, Japan between the 25th and 30th of May in 1958. Shooting comprised 6 events, all open to both men and women. There were two pistol events, three rifle events and trap as a shotgun event in the program.

The host nation Japan won five out of six possible gold medals. Adolfo Feliciano from the Philippines won the remaining gold medal in the 300m rifle event.

Medalists

Medal table

References 

 ISSF Results Overview
 The Straits Times, May 26–31, 1958

External links
Asian Shooting Federation

 
1958 Asian Games events
1958
Asian Games
1958 Asian Games